Caulanthus coulteri is a species of flowering plant in the family Brassicaceae known by the common name Coulter's wild cabbage.

It is endemic to California, where it is a widespread member of the flora in several dry, open habitat types, such as chaparral and Mojave Desert.

Description

The widely spaced flowers are somewhat bullet-shaped with coats of pouched sepals which are bright to deep purple when new and fade to yellow-green. The sepals open to reveal dark-veined petal tips with wavy margins.

The fruit is a long, thin silique which may approach 13 centimeters in length.

References

External links

Photo gallery

coulteri
Endemic flora of California
Flora of the California desert regions
Flora of the Sierra Nevada (United States)
Natural history of the California chaparral and woodlands
Natural history of the California Coast Ranges
Natural history of the Central Valley (California)
Natural history of the Mojave Desert
Natural history of the Santa Monica Mountains
Plants described in 1871